Niccolò Rondinelli (c. 1468 – c. 1520) was an Italian painter of the Renaissance period, active mainly in Ravenna, where he was born. He was a pupil of the painter Giovanni Bellini. Also called Nicolo or Niccoló Rondinello. Among his pupils were Baldassare Carrari and Francesco da Cotignola.

References

1460s births
1520s deaths
People from Ravenna
15th-century Italian painters
Italian male painters
16th-century Italian painters
Painters from Venice
Italian Renaissance painters